This is a complete list of members of the United States House of Representatives from Delaware.

Elections are by a popular vote originally elected on the first Tuesday of October, but after 1831 on the first Tuesday after November 1.

Terms began on the subsequent March 4 until 1935, from when they began on January 3.

Delaware has had only one U.S. representative, except for 10 years between 1813 and 1823, when there was a second U.S. representative. This person was elected statewide, at-large, on the same ballot as the first U.S. representative. The two candidates with the highest number of votes were elected.

Current representative 

 : Lisa Blunt Rochester (D): (since 2017)

List of members

See also

List of United States senators from Delaware
United States congressional delegations from Delaware
Delaware's congressional districts

References

 
 

United States representatives
Delaware